Thiago Gastón Cardozo Brugman (born 31 July 1996) is a Uruguayan professional footballer who plays as a goalkeeper for Peñarol.

Club career
A youth academy graduate of Peñarol, Cardozo made his professional debut on 5 May 2018 in a 4–1 league win against Defensor Sporting. In April 2021, he joined Deportivo Maldonado on a season long loan deal.

International career
Cardozo is a former Uruguayan youth international. He was included in national team for the 2013 South American U-17 Championship, 2013 FIFA U-17 World Cup, 2015 South American U-20 Championship and 2015 FIFA U-20 World Cup.

Career statistics

References

External links
 

1996 births
Living people
Uruguayan people of Portuguese descent
Uruguayan people of German descent
Association football goalkeepers
Uruguayan footballers
Uruguayan Primera División players
Peñarol players
Deportivo Maldonado players